Orthodox, Orthodoxy, or Orthodoxism may refer to:

Religion
 Orthodoxy, adherence to accepted norms, more specifically adherence to creeds, especially within Christianity and Judaism, but also less commonly in non-Abrahamic religions like Neo-paganism or Hinduism

Christian

Traditional Christian denominations 
 Eastern Orthodox Church, the world's second largest Christian church, that accepts seven Ecumenical Councils
Oriental Orthodox Churches, a Christian communion that accepts three Ecumenical Councils

Modern denominations 
 True Orthodox Churches, also called Old Calendarists, a movement that separated from the mainstream Eastern Orthodox Church in the 1920s over issues of ecumenism and calendar reform
 Reformed Orthodoxy (16th–18th century), a systematized, institutionalized and codified Reformed theology
 Neo-orthodoxy, a theological position also known as dialectical theology
 Paleo-orthodoxy, (20th–21st century), a movement in the United States focusing on the consensus among the ecumenical councils and church fathers
 Communion of Western Orthodox Churches a communion of Christian churches of Orthodox tradition adhering to customs of western Christianity
 Lutheran orthodoxy, an era in the history of Lutheranism which began in 1580 from the writing of the Book of Concord
 Orthodox Presbyterian Church, a confessional Presbyterian denomination located primarily in the northern United States

Academic term 
 Proto-orthodox Christianity, a term coined by New Testament scholar Bart D. Ehrman to describe the Early Christian movement which was the precursor of Christian orthodoxy

Non-Christian
 Orthodox Judaism, a branch of Judaism
Modern Orthodox Judaism, is a movement within Orthodox Judaism
Haredi Judaism, groups within Orthodox Judaism that reject modern secular culture
Hasidic Judaism, a sub-group within Haredi Judaism noted for its religious conservatism and, typically, social seclusion
 Orthodox Islam, generally refers to Sunni Islam
 Orthodox Hinduism, a term for Sanātanī
 Orthodox Bahá'í Faith, a small Baha'i denomination
 Kemetic Orthodoxy, an Egyptian neo-pagan religion that intends to reform and restore ancient Egyptian religion
 Slavic Native Faith or Rodovery Orthodoxy, a term used by Neo-Slavic pagan religious organizations

Other uses
 Left-arm orthodox spin, a bowling technique in cricket
 Orthodox (album), a 2013 album by American rock band Beware of Darkness
 Orthodox (Jordan), a Jordanian basketball club
 Orthodox File Managers, a user interface to work with file systems
 Orthodox Marxism, the dominant form of Marxist philosophy between the death of Karl Marx and the beginning of World War I
 Orthodox seed, a seed which may be preserved via drying or freezing
 Orthodox stance, a way of positioning the feet and hands in combat sports

See also
Anti-Orthodox (disambiguation)
 Heterodoxy
 Orthodox calendar (disambiguation)
 Orthodox Church (disambiguation)
 Orthodox Communion (disambiguation)
 Orthodoxy by country (disambiguation)
 Unorthodox (disambiguation)